Thomas Shepherd may refer to:

 Thomas H. Shepherd (1792–1864), water colour artist known for his architectural works
 Tom Shepherd (1889–1957), English cricketer who played for Surrey
 Thomas "Tommy", Shepherd aka Speed
 Thomas Luther Shepherd (1829–1884), New Zealand politician
 Thomas D. Shepherd, American college football player and coach

See also
 Thomas Shepard (disambiguation)
 Thomas Sheppard (disambiguation)